This is an incomplete list of museums located in Romania:

In Wallachia

Bucharest

Other
 Vergu-Mănăilă House – Buzău
 Craiova Art Museum – Craiova
 Museum of Oltenia – Craiova
 Luminiș – Sinaia
 Iron Gates Region Museum – Drobeta-Turnu Severin
 Reșița Steam Locomotive Museum - Reșița

In Dobruja
 Tulcea Art Museum – Tulcea

In Moldavia

Iaşi
 Moldova National Museum Complex
 
 
 
  (in Ruginoasa)
 Cucuteni Neolithic Archeological Site Museum
 
  (in Hârlău)
 
 
 
 
 Ion Creangă Museum
 Dosoftei Museum
 Mihai Codreanu Museum
 Vasile Pogor Museum
 Otilia Cazimir Museum
 
 Mihail Sadoveanu Museum
 George Topîrceanu Museum
 Mihai Eminescu Museum
 Nicolae Gane Museum
 House of Museums
 Romanian Literature Museum
 Museum of Poetry
 Museum of the Jewish Theatre in Romania
 Museum of Iași Pogrom
 Museum of Childhood under Communism
 Vasile Alecsandri Museum (in Mircești)
 Constantin Negruzzi Museum (in Hermeziu)
 Garabet Ibrăileanu museum point (in Târgu Frumos)
 Ionel Teodoreanu museum point (in Golăiești)
 
 
 
 Metropolitan Museum of Iași
 Cotnari Princely Court

Other
 "Hanul Domnesc" (The Princely Inn) Ethnographic Museum – Suceava
 Archaeology Museum Piatra Neamț
 Wooden Spoons Museum, Câmpulung Moldovenesc

In Transylvania

Cluj-Napoca
 Transylvanian History Museum
 Ethnographic Museum of Transylvania
 Cluj-Napoca Bánffy Palace
 Art Museum of Cluj-Napoca

Sibiu
 Brukenthal National Museum
 ASTRA National Museum Complex
 Sibiu Steam Locomotives Museum

Other
 Museum of Dacian and Roman Civilisation – Deva
 Teleki Library – Târgu-Mureş
 Crișeni – Museum of Straw Hats
 Baia Mare Artistic Center Museum of Art – Baia Mare

See also
 Culture of Romania
 National Register of Historic Monuments in Romania
 List of historical monuments in Romania

External links
 Museums and Collections in Romania
 Museums and Collections in Romania (Romanian version)
 Museums in Romania
 Museums from Romanian Regions

Tourism in Romania
Lists of buildings and structures in Romania
Romania education-related lists

Romania
Museums
Romania